Phyllodesmium longicirrum, common name the solar-powered phyllodesmium, is a species of sea slug, an aeolid nudibranch, a marine gastropod mollusc in the family Facelinidae.

Distribution 
The distribution of Phyllodesmium longicirrum includes Australia and Indonesia.

Description 
This is a very large species, growing to at least 140 mm. Phyllodesmium longicirrum contains photosynthetic zooxanthellae, which allow it to draw energy from sunlight, hence its common name, the solar-powered phyllodesmium. This is actually a misleading name, as several other species of Phyllodesmium are also capable of photosynthesis, although this is developed to the greatest extreme in this species.

Ecology 
Phyllodesmium longicirrum feeds on soft coral Sarcophyton trocheliophorum (family Alcyoniidae).

References

External links 

 Phyllodesmium longicirrum at Slug Site, Miller, M.

Facelinidae
Gastropods described in 1905